Melekli (previously in Armenian: հրեշտակային, romanized: Hreshtakayin, Russian: ангельский, romanized: Angel'skiy) is a belde (town) in the central district (Iğdır) of Iğdır Province, Turkey. 
In 2020 it had a population of 3,564.

References

External links
 
  

Populated places in Iğdır Province
Towns in Turkey
Iğdır Central District
Kurdish settlements in Turkey
Former Armenian inhabited settlements